Dromococcyx is a genus of uncommon to rare cuckoos found in forests and woodlands of the Neotropics. They have strikingly graduated tails, and are among the few cuckoos of the Americas that are brood parasites (the only other is the striped cuckoo).

Species
The genus contains the following species:

References

 
Neomorphinae
Bird genera
 
 
Taxonomy articles created by Polbot